Luis Nahuel Luna (born 14 February 1996) is an Argentine professional footballer who plays as a forward for Villa San Carlos, on loan from Estudiantes.

Career
Luna started his career with Estudiantes, who he signed for in 2010. He made his professional debut in a 2016 Argentine Primera División fixture with Huracán on 5 March. Torneo Federal A side San Jorge loaned Luna in June 2017. Six appearances followed for the club during 2017–18. On 10 February 2018, Luna joined Categoría Primera B side Orsomarso on loan. His first appearance arrived on 17 February against Universitario Popayán, which was one of four appearances for Orsomarso before he returned to Estudiantes in July. Luna was loaned to Temperley in January 2019.

Career statistics
.

References

External links

1996 births
Living people
Sportspeople from San Miguel de Tucumán
Argentine footballers
Association football forwards
Argentine expatriate footballers
Expatriate footballers in Colombia
Argentine expatriate sportspeople in Colombia
Argentine Primera División players
Torneo Federal A players
Categoría Primera B players
Estudiantes de La Plata footballers
San Jorge de Tucumán footballers
Orsomarso S.C. footballers
Club Atlético Temperley footballers
Club Atlético Villa San Carlos footballers